Luzindole (N-0774), (N-acetyl-2-benzyltryptamine), is a drug used in scientific research to study the role of melatonin in the body. Luzindole acts as a selective melatonin receptor antagonist, with approximately 11- to 25-fold greater affinity for the MT2 over the MT1 receptor. In animal studies, it has been observed to disrupt the circadian rhythm as well as produce antidepressant effects.

References

Acetamides
Tryptamines
Melatonin receptor antagonists